The Lufira River is a tributary of the Lualaba River in the Democratic Republic of the Congo (DRC).

The Lufira rises in the Shaba plateau south of Likasi.
The river was dammed in 1926 at Mwadingusha near Likasi to form Lake Tshangalele, a reservoir for a hydroelectric generator supplying power for copper smelting.

References

Lualaba River
Rivers of the Democratic Republic of the Congo
Ramsar sites in the Democratic Republic of the Congo